Singapore participated in the 2018 Asian Games in Jakarta and Palembang, Indonesia from 18 August to 2 September 2018. It was Singapore's 18th appearance at the Asian Games, having competed at every Games since 1951, and claimed 8 gold, 7 silver, and 12 bronze medals at the 2006 Doha, as their best achievement this far. At the last edition of 2014 Asian Games in Incheon, South Korea, the country won five gold, 6 silver, and 13 bronze medals. 

Singapore sent 265 athletes across 21 sports to compete in Jakarta and Palembang. Former Singaporean shooter Lee Wung Yew assigned as chef de mission for the contingent. At the opening ceremony parade, gymnast Hoe Wah Toon was unveiled as the flag bearer. The country made its debut in four sports, include contract bridge, artistic swimming, ju-jitsu and paragliding.

Media coverage
Singaporean public broadcasting conglomerate Mediacorp held the broadcast rights of the 2018 Asian Games in the country. It broadcast the games through seven live channels on digital video on demand service Toggle (now meWATCH) including oktoSports.

Medalists

The following Singapore competitors won medals at the Games.

|  style="text-align:left; width:78%; vertical-align:top;"|

|  style="text-align:left; width:22%; vertical-align:top;"|

Competitors 
The following is a list of the number of competitors representing Singapore that participated at the Games:

Demonstration events

Archery 

National Sports Associations (NSA) has nominate 9 archers (5 men's and 4 women's) that will compete at the Games. The Singapore National Olympic Council (SNOC) will decide athletes who will compete.

Recurve

Compound

Artistic swimming 

SNOC were included 8 women's to participate at the Games.

Athletics 

NSA has nominate 8 athletes (one men and 7 women's) that will compete at the Games. The SNOC will decide athletes who will compete.

Men
Track & road events

Women
Track & road events

Field events

Bowling 

Singapore Bowling announced the 12-strong squad (6 men's and 6 women's) on 3 July 2018.

Men

Women

Canoeing

Sprint

Qualification legend: QF=Final; QS=Semifinal

Traditional boat race 

Men

Women

Canoe polo (demonstration) 
Singapore Canoe Federation entered their 12 athletes ( 6 men's and women's) at the demonstration sport canoe polo event.

Contract bridge 

Men

Women

Mixed

Cycling

Road

Track

Pursuit

Omnium

Diving 

Men

Women

Equestrian 

Singapore represented by two riders compete at the equestrian dressage event.

Dressage

Fencing 

Individual

Team

Golf 

Singapore announced 4 men's golfers for the Games. Gregory Foo and Joshua Ho was part of the Singapore team that won the gold medal at the 2017 Southeast Asian Games.

Men

Gymnastics 

Four gymnasts (2 men's and 2 women's) have qualified to compete at the Games.

Artistic 
Men
Individual finals

Women
Individual finals

Ju-jitsu 

Singapore entered 7 athletes (5 men's and 2 women's) to make their debut at the Asian Games. Constance Lien reached the women's ne-waza 62 kg event finals and clinched the silver medal.

Men

Women

Paragliding 

The SNOC sent Goh See Fen to make her debut at the Asian Games.

Women

Pencak silat 

Seni

Tanding

Rowing 

The Singapore Rowing represented by Joan Poh Xue Hua in the W1X category.

Women

Rugby sevens 

Singapore women's rugby sevens team competed at the Games in group A.

Women's tournament 

Squad
The following is the Singapore squad in the women's rugby sevens tournament of the 2018 Asian Games.

Head coach: Wang Shao Ing

Chan Jia Yu
Sim Chiew Hong
Ong Pei Yi
Eunice Chu
Nur S. Mohd Abdul Gaffoor
Jayne Chan
Christabelle Lim
Low Yu Hui
Alvinia Ow Yong
Arra Heloise Castro Huab
Rachel Wang
Amanda Ng

Group A

Quarterfinal

Classification semifinal (5–8)

Fifth place game

Sailing

Men

Women

Mixed

Sepak takraw 

Men

Shooting 

Men

Women

Mixed team

Sport climbing 

Speed

Speed relay

Combined

Squash 

Singles

Team

Swimming

Men

 Swimmers who participated in the heats only.
 Swimmers who participated in the heats only and received medals.

Women

 Swimmers who participated in the heats only.
 Swimmers who participated in the heats only and received medals.

Mixed

 Swimmers who participated in the heats only.

Table tennis 

Singapore entered the table tennis competition with one men and 5 women's players. Zhou Yihan who suffered a wrist injury had been replaced by Pearlyn Koh.

Individual

Team

Water polo 

Summary

Men's tournament

Team roster
Head coach:  Dejan Milaković

Darren Lee (GK)
Loh Zhi shi (CB) (C)
Ooi Yee Jia (D)
Chow Jing Lun (D)
Glen Lim (D)
Samuel Yu (CF)
Chiam Kun Yang (D)
Ang An Jun (CB)
Yu Junjie (CF)
Sean Ang (D)
Lee Cheng Kang (D)
Koh Jian Ying (D)
Lee Kai Yang (GK)

Group A

Quarter-final

Classification semifinal (5–8)

Fifth place game

Wushu 

Taolu

Sanda

See also 
 Singapore at the 2018 Asian Para Games

References 

Nations at the 2018 Asian Games
2018
Asian Games